La Mar Province is a province in the north-east corner of the Ayacucho Region, Peru. It was created on March 30, 1861.

Geography 
Other mountains are listed below:

Political division
The province is divided into ten districts (Spanish: distritos, singular: distrito), each of which is headed by a mayor (alcalde). The districts, with their capitals in parentheses, are:
 Anco (Chiquintirca)
 Ayna (San Francisco)
 Chilcas (Chilcas)
 Chungui (Chungui)
 Luis Carranza (Pampas)
 San Miguel (San Miguel)
 Santa Rosa (Santa Rosa)
 Samugari (Palmapampa)
 Tambo (Tambo)
 Anchihuay (Anchihuay)

Ethnic groups 
The people in the province are mainly indigenous citizens of Quechua descent. Quechua is the language which the majority of the population (82.96%) learnt to speak in childhood, 16.58% of the residents started speaking using the Spanish language (2007 Peru Census).

Archaeology 
Some of the most important archaeological sites of the province are K'allapayuq Urqu and Waraqu Urqu.

References

External links
  Municipal website

Provinces of the Ayacucho Region
1861 establishments in Peru